Saint-Loup is a commune in the Manche department in Normandy in north-western France.

See also

Communes of the Manche department

References

Saintloup